Kherojirao Pattikar was Koli subedar of Maratha Army of Maratha Empire during the reign of Maratha ruler Chhatrapati Shivaji.

Early life 
Kheroji Pattikar was born in a Mahadev Koli family of Maval to Sambhajirao Pattikar who was vessel under Peshwa.

Capture of Trimbak fort 
The Kherojirao Pattikar Along with other Koli chief and close aide Gamaji Bhangare collected an army of Kolis of Maval region known as Koli Mavala and attacked at the Trimbak fort of Nizam of Hyderabad state on the behalf of current Peshwa Moropant Trimbak Pingle. Pattikar and Bhangare captured the fort and annexed into Maratha Empire. Kherojirao Pattikar and Gamaji Bhangare were received the grant of villages, money and title of Deshmukh for ruling that villages by Peshwa.

Titles 

 Pattikar, the family of Kherojirao was landholding or chief of village so they were given the title of Pattikar for holding or maintaining the village.
 Patil, Kherojirao was chief, or Patil of Kolis who maintains the law and order in Koli caste and responsible for religious activities.
 Deshmukh, after capturing the fort of Trimbak, Kheroji received the grant of villages and title of Deshmukh for ruling over these villages.
 Mavala, Kheroji was known as Mavala because of the Maval region which was known as Koli country.

References

External links 
Gazetteer of the Bombay Presidency ..., Volume 17

Koli people
17th-century Indian people